The 2019 Girls' U16 European Volleyball Championship was the 2nd edition of the Girls' U16 European Volleyball Championship, a biennial international volleyball tournament organised by the European Volleyball Confederation (CEV) the girls' under-16 national teams of Europe. The tournament was held in Italy and Croatia from 13 to 21 July 2019.

Qualification

Venues

Preliminary round

Pool I

|}

|}

Pool II

|}

|}

5th–8th classification

5th–8th semifinals

|}

7th-place match

|}

5th-place match

|}

Final round

Semifinals

|}

3rd-place match

|}

Final

|}

Final standing

Awards
At the conclusion of the tournament, the following players were selected as the tournament dream team.

Most Valuable Player
  Özge Arslanalp
Best Setter
  Özge Arslanalp
Best Outside Spikers
  Arina Fedorovtseva
  Naja Šalamun
Fair play
  Greta Catania

Best Middle Blockers
  Natalia Suvorova
  Neja Čižman
Best Opposite Spiker
  Taja Gradišnik Klanjšček
Best Libero
  Benedetta Salviato

References

External links
Official website

Girls' Youth European Volleyball Championship
Europe
Volleyball
International women's volleyball competitions hosted by Italy
International volleyball competitions hosted by Croatia
Volleyball European Championship (girls)